The Pucikwar were one of the indigenous peoples of the Andaman Islands, one of the ten or so Great Andamanese tribes identified by British colonials in the 1860s. They spoke a distinctive Pucikwar language (A-Pucikwar) closely related to the other Great Andamanese languages. The tribe disappeared as a distinct group sometime after 1931.

As the numbers of Great Andamanese progressively declined over the succeeding decades, the various Great Andamanese tribes either disappeared altogether or became amalgamated through intermarriage. By the 1901 census, the Pucikwar were reduced to 50, but distinctions between tribal groups and subgroups had become considerably blurred (and some intermarriage had also occurred with Indian and Karen (Burmese) settlers).  By 1994, the 38 remaining Great Andamanese who could trace their ancestry and culture back to the original tribes belonged to only three of them (Jeru, Bo, and Cari).

References

Scheduled Tribes of the Andaman and Nicobar Islands
Indigenous peoples of South Asia
Ethnic groups in the Andaman and Nicobar Islands
History of the Andaman and Nicobar Islands